Werner Scholz may refer to:
 Werner Scholz (footballer)
 Werner Scholz (violinist)